Brian Cadd is the debut self-titled album by Australian musician Brian Cadd. It was released on the Bootleg Records label in 1972 and peaked at number 3 for three weeks on the Australian Go-Set chart. It contained the hit single "Ginger Man".

At the Federation of Australia Commercial Broadcasters awards of 1972, the album won Best Male Vocal Album.

The album was re-released in 1979 by Summit Records until the title Best of Brian Cadd.

Track listing
All tracks composed by Brian Cadd

Side A
 "Fairweather Friend"	- 3:12
 "Tell the World to Go Away" - 6:03
 "Where the Music's Playing" - 4:12
 "Josie McGinty" - 2:11
 "Tell Me About Freedom Again" - 5:03

Side B
 "Ginger Man" - 4:00
 "Pappy's Got the Blues" - 4:00
 "Silver City Birthday Celebration Day" - 3:59
 "Suite for Life" - 5:20
 "Every Mother's Son"  (bonus track)  - 3:47

Charts

Weekly charts

Year-end charts

References

Brian Cadd albums
1972 debut albums